Bhargavi is an epithet of the goddess Lakshmi in Hinduism.

People
Bhargavi (actress) (1983–2008), Telugu actress 
Bhargavi Chirmule (born 1978), Marathi actress
Bhargavi Davar, Indian activist
Bhargavi Rao (1944–2008), Telugu writer and translator
Manju Bhargavi (born 1955), Telugu actress and dancer
Sravana Bhargavi (born 1989), Telugu playback singer

Other uses
Bhargavi River, Orissa, India
S. P. Bhargavi, a 1991 Kannada action film